A multiple-effect evaporator, as defined in chemical engineering, is an apparatus for efficiently using the heat from steam to evaporate water. Water is boiled in a sequence of vessels, each held at a lower pressure than the last.  Because the boiling temperature of water decreases as pressure decreases, the vapor boiled off in one vessel can be used to heat the next, and only the first vessel (at the highest pressure) requires an external source of heat.  While in theory, evaporators may be built with an arbitrarily large number of stages, evaporators with more than four stages are rarely practical except in systems where the liquor is the desired product such as in chemical recovery systems where up to seven effects are used.

The multiple-effect evaporator was invented by an African-American inventor and engineer Norbert Rillieux.  Although he may have designed the apparatus during the 1820s and constructed a prototype in 1834, he did not build the first industrially practical evaporator until 1845.  Originally designed for concentrating sugar in sugar cane juice, it has since become widely used in all industrial applications where large volumes of water must be evaporated, such as salt production and water desalination.

Multiple effect evaporation commonly uses sensible heat in the condensate to preheat liquor to be flashed.  In practice the design liquid flow paths can be somewhat complicated in order to extract the most recoverable heat and to obtain the highest evaporation rates from the equipment. 

Multiple-effect evaporation plants in sugar beet factories have up to eight effects. Sextuple effect evaporators are common in the recovery of black liquor in the kraft process for making wood pulp.

See also 
 Marine use of compound evaporators
 Multi-stage flash distillation
 Multi-effect distillation

References 

Evaporators
Industrial equipment